Ludwigshafen, officially Ludwigshafen am Rhein (meaning "Ludwig's Port upon Rhine"), is a city in the German state of Rhineland-Palatinate, on the river Rhine, opposite Mannheim. With Mannheim, Heidelberg, and the surrounding region, it forms the Rhine Neckar Area.

Known primarily as an industrial city, Ludwigshafen is home to BASF, the world's largest chemical producer, and other companies. Among its cultural facilities are the Staatsphilharmonie Rheinland-Pfalz. It is the birthplace and deathplace of the former German chancellor Helmut Kohl.

In 2012, Ludwigshafen was classified as a global city with 'Sufficiency' status by the Globalization and World Cities Research Network (GaWC).

History

Early history
In antiquity, Celtic and Germanic tribes settled in the Rhine Neckar area. During the 1st century B.C. the Romans conquered the region, and a Roman auxiliary fort was constructed near the present suburb of Rheingönheim.

The Middle Ages saw the foundation of some of Ludwigshafen's future suburbs, including Oggersheim, Maudach, Oppau, and Mundenheim. Most of the area, however, remained swampland, with its development hindered by seasonal flooding of the Rhine.

The Rheinschanze

The Rhine Neckar region was part of the territory of the Prince-elector of the Kurpfalz, or Electorate of the Palatinate, one of the larger states within the Holy Roman Empire. The foundation of the new capital of the Kurpfalz, Mannheim, was a decisive influence on the development of the area as a whole. Parallel to the foundation of Mannheim in 1606, a fortress (die Rheinschanze) was built by Frederick IV, Elector Palatine on the other side of the Rhine to protect the City of Mannheim, thus forming the nucleus of the City of Ludwigshafen itself.

In the 17th century the region was devastated and depopulated during the Thirty Years' War, and also in King Louis XIV of France’s wars of conquest in the later part of the century.

It was only in the 18th century that the settlements around the Rheinschanze began to prosper, profiting from the proximity of the capital Mannheim. Oggersheim in particular gained some importance, after the construction of both a small palace serving as secondary residence for the Elector, and the famous pilgrimage church, Wallfahrtskirche. For some weeks in 1782, the great German writer and playwright Friedrich Schiller lived in Oggersheim, on flight from his native Württemberg.

War returned to the Ludwigshafen area with the armies of the French Revolution. The palace at Oggersheim was burned down, Mannheim besieged several times, and all the area west of the Rhine annexed by France from 1798 to 1813. The Electorate of the Palatinate was split up. The eastern bank of the Rhine with Mannheim and Heidelberg was given to Baden, while the western bank (including the Ludwigshafen area) was granted to the Kingdom of Bavaria, following the Wars of Liberation (1813-1815), in which the French were expelled. The Rhine had become a frontier and the Rheinschanze, cut off politically from Mannheim, lost its function as the neighbouring city's military bulwark.

Foundation

In 1808, during the French occupation, Carl Hornig of Mannheim purchased the fortress from the French authorities and turned it into a way station for passing river traffic. Later, the Rheinschanze with its winter-proof harbour basin (created by a flood in 1824) was used as trading post. Hornig died in 1819, but Johann Heinrich Scharpff, a businessman from Speyer, continued Hornig's plans, which were then turned over to his son-in-law, Philipp Markus Lichtenberger, in 1830. Their activities marked the beginning of the civilian use of the Rheinschanze.

The year 1844 was the official birth of Ludwigshafen, when Lichtenberger sold this property to the state of Bavaria (Bayern), and the military title of the fortress was finally removed. The Bavarian king, Ludwig I, set forth plans to rename the settlement after himself and to start construction of an urban area as a Bavarian rival to Mannheim on the opposite bank.

During the failed German revolution of 1848 rebels captured Ludwigshafen, but they were bombarded from Mannheim (rumours said the Mannheimers didn't aim at the revolutionaries, but on the rival harbour's infrastructure), and Prussian troops quickly expelled the revolutionaries. On December 27, 1852, King Maximilian II granted Ludwigshafen am Rhein political freedom and as on November 8, 1859, the settlement gained city status.

Industry and growth of population

At its founding Ludwigshafen was still a very modest settlement with just 1,500 inhabitants. Real growth began with industrialization, and gained enormous momentum in Ludwigshafen due to its ideal transport facilities. In addition to its excellent position and harbor facilities on the Rhine, a railway connecting Ludwigshafen with the Saar coalfields was completed in 1849.

The year 1865 was an important date in the history of independent Ludwigshafen. After several discussions, BASF decided to move its factories from Mannheim to the Hemshof district, which belonged to Ludwigshafen. From then on, the city's rapid growth and wealth were linked to BASF's success and its expansion into becoming one of the world's most important chemical companies.

With more jobs available, the population of Ludwigshafen increased rapidly. In 1899 the city was governing more than 62,000 residents (compared to 1,500 in 1852).

This population explosion looked quite “American” to contemporaries; it determined Ludwigshafen's character as a “worker's city”, and created problematic shortages of housing and real estate. The solution was the expansion of the municipal area and the incorporation of the two nearest villages, Friesenheim and Mundenheim, in the years 1892 and 1899. In the area between the city centre and those two suburbs new quarters (“North” and “South”) were built after (then) modern urban development plans. Because the ground was marshy and too low to be protected from Rhine floods, all the new houses were built on raised ground, sometimes as high as 5 metres above the original ground. Visitors can see the original ground level in many backyards of Ludwigshafen, which are sometimes two floors below street level.

World War I through World War II
During World War I (1914–1918), Ludwigshafen's industrial plants played a key role in Germany's war economy, producing chemical ingredients for munitions, as well as much of the poison gas used on the Western Front. This contributed to Ludwigshafen, on May 27, 1915, being the target of the world's first strategic aerial bombardment. French aircraft attacked the BASF plants, killing twelve people and setting the precedent for the age to come.

When the war was lost by Germany in 1918, the left bank of the Rhine was occupied by French troops, in accordance with the terms of the peace agreement. The French occupation lasted until 1930, and some of Ludwigshafen's most elegant houses were erected for the officers of the French garrison.

The economic recovery of the 1920s was marred by one of the worst industrial explosions in history when, on Sept. 21, 1921, a BASF storage silo in Oppau blew up, killing more than 500 people, injuring a further 2,000, and destroying countless buildings.

Despite this setback, Ludwigshafen reached a population of 100,000 in 1922, thus gaining "City" status. It prospered until the worldwide economic crisis of 1929, which brought unemployment, labor trouble, political strife, and the rise of the Nazis.

The Nazi party had few followers and votes in working-class-dominated Ludwigshafen, but succeeded in enforcing their policies. Many small houses with gardens were built, especially in the Gartenstadt. Further, similar to Nazi plans in other cities (e.g. Hamburg), they aimed at creating a "Greater Ludwigshafen" by agglomerating smaller towns and villages in the vicinity. Thus Oggersheim, Oppau, Edigheim, Rheingönheim, and Maudach became suburbs of Ludwigshafen, raising its population to 135,000. The Ludwigshafen synagogue was destroyed in 1938 and its Jewish population of 1,400 was deported in 1940.

During the Oil Campaign of World War II, the Allies conducted bombing of Ludwigshafen and Oppau. Thirteen thousand Allied bombers hit the city in 121 separate raids during the war, of which 56 succeeded in hitting the IG Farben plant. Those 56 raids dropped 53,000 bombs each containing 250 to 4,000 pounds of high explosives, plus 2.5 million 4-pound magnesium incendiary bombs (the bombers also dropped millions of leaflets warning the civilians to evacuate the city, plus counterfeit ration coupons).  Repairs took longer and longer as spare parts became more difficult to find. By December 1944, so much damage had been done to vital utilities that output dropped to nearly zero. Follow-up raids every week ended production permanently. By the end of the war most dwellings had been destroyed or damaged; 1,800 people had died, and 3,000 were injured.

The Allied ground advance into Germany reached Ludwigshafen in March 1945. The US 12th Armored Division and 94th Infantry Division captured Ludwigshafen against determined German resistance in house-to-house and block-to-block urban combat during 21–24 March 1945.

Post-war rebuilding
Post-war, Ludwigshafen was part of the French occupation zone, becoming part of the newly founded Bundesland (state) of Rheinland-Pfalz and thus part of the Federal Republic of Germany. Reconstruction of the devastated city and revival of the economy was supported by the Allies, especially by American aid. In 1948, the "Pasadena Shares Committee" sent packages of blankets, clothing, food, and medicines to help the residents of post-war Ludwigshafen. Many friendships started to form, so that in 1956, Ludwigshafen am Rhein and Pasadena, California became sister cities.

Large parts of the city were literally ruined, which were rebuilt in the architectural style of the 1950s and 1960s. The most important projects were the Hochstraßen (highways on stilts), the revolutionary new main station (then the most modern station in Europe), several tower blocks and a whole new suburb, the satellite quarter Pfingstweide north of Edigheim.

The city's economic wealth allowed social benefits and institutions to be introduced. The population number reached its all-time climax in 1970 with more than 180,000 inhabitants, thus surpassing even the capital of Rheinland-Pfalz, Mainz, for a while.

Financial crisis
In the early 1970s, a plan to reform the composition of the German Bundesländer, which would have created a new state around a united Mannheim-Ludwigshafen as capital with more than half a million inhabitants, failed.

Nevertheless, further ambitious projects were financed in Ludwigshafen, first of all the 15-floor city hall with its linked-up shopping centre (Rathaus Center). The last (up to now)  new incorporated suburb was Ruchheim in 1974.

But then a process began that accelerated during the 1980s and 1990s and caused the financial near-collapse of Ludwigshafen. The enormous maintenance costs of the buildings and institutions introduced during the "fat time", new tax regulations that cut down the trade tax profits from the local industries, and thousands of dismissals in BASF were the main causes for the city's crisis. Loss of population due to the loss of working places and general economic trends, such as the oil crises, further worsened Ludwigshafen's financial situation at the end of the 20th century.

The negative aspects of industrial success became obvious when examinations revealed the bad state of air and the Rhine due to pollution. There had always been some stench or dirt all over the city, caused by BASF and other plants, and as long as the industry had prospered, people had accepted it. Besides that, the concrete constructions that had been so modern after the war and had a formative influence on today's cityscape were increasingly considered as obsolete.

Contemporary Ludwigshafen
 
In recent years, many efforts have been made to enhance Ludwigshafen's image in the media. The city administration has cut down its deficit by cutting down social payments and maintenance, pollution has been (not least by BASF) restricted, the formerly rotten Hemshof quarter has been restored.

In 2008, a fire broke out in a building where many ethnic Turks lived. 9 people died, all of them Turks and 5 of them children. It was believed to be an arsonist attack, however this was found to be not true.

One of the most annoying faults of Ludwigshafen – at least for many of the city's inhabitants - was its comparative lack of high-quality shopping possibilities. It has attempted to repair this deficiency by creating a second large shopping mall on the southern tip of the city centre (the Walzmühle near Berliner Platz) with affiliated railway station (Ludwigshafen-Mitte).  In addition, another shopping mall on the banks of the Rhine, the Rhein-Galerie, was completed in September 2010.

Ludwigshafen has enormous importance as an industrial city.

Districts

Centre

The city centre of Ludwigshafen is comparatively small and dominated by post-war buildings. Its northern and southern boundaries are the Hochstraßen (highways on stilts), the Rhine is in the East and the main station is located in the West of downtown Ludwigshafen, at a walking distance of about 15 minutes from the central pedestrian precinct Bismarckstraße that forms, together with the shopping mile Ludwigsstraße, the main North-South Axis, connecting the so-called “North Pole” with the Rathaus Center and the “South Pole” with Berliner Platz, the Walzmühle shopping centre and Ludwigshafen (Rhein) Mitte station. The main east–west connections are the Bahnhofsstraße and Kaiser-Wilhelm-Straße. The Pfalzbau, Staatsphilharmonie, Wilhelm-Hack-Museum and the half-destroyed monument Lutherkirche are main features of downtown Ludwigshafen.

South

The Südliche Innenstadt or “southern city centre” (ca. 29,000 inhabitants) includes the real city centre as described above and the Stadtteil Süd or “South” quarter. “South” has some of the most attractive residential areas, especially the Parkinsel area. Other sub-quarters of “South” are the Musikantenviertel or the Malerviertel. In a few years, there will be one more highly prized residential area (“Rheinufer Süd”) on the Rhine near the Walzmühle on former industrial estates.

North

The Nördliche Innenstadt (ca. 22,000 inhabitants) includes the Hemshof, “North” and “West” districts. Hemshof and “North” represent the “old town” of Ludwigshafen, they are known for their very high proportion of foreign inhabitants, making them culturally diverse. ”West” (also called Valentin-Bauer-Siedlung) is located between main station and main cemetery.

Friesenheim

Friesenheim (ca. 18,000 inhabitants) is located north of Hemshof and is one of the two (the other one being Mundenheim) “mother villages” of Ludwigshafen, because they were responsible for the administration of Ludwigshafen prior to its independence. Helmut Kohl was born in Friesenheim. Its western district, the Froschlache, boasts four impressive tower blocks.

Oppau

Oppau (ca. 10,000 inhabitants) in the North is dominated by the nearby BASF and had once been a town of its own prior to its incorporation into Ludwigshafen. In its history, it has been afflicted by several catastrophes like the explosion of 1921 and the flood of 1882.

Edigheim

Edigheim (ca. 9,000 inhabitants) had once been a part of Oppau in the South, today ist almost as large as Oppau.

The Pfingstweide (ca. 6,000 inhabitants) is Ludwigshafen's northernmost district; it is dominated by tower blocks and is located in close vicinity to Frankenthal.

Gartenstadt

The Gartenstadt (ca. 18,000 inhabitants), west of Mundenheim, is (as the name “garden city” suggests) a very green suburb, dominated by flat roofed houses and some tower blocks.  Its sub-districts are Niederfeld, Hochfeld and Ernst-Reuter-Siedlung.

Mundenheim

Mundenheim (ca. 13,000 inhabitants) is a very old suburb, it boasts its own railway station, an extensive industrial area near the harbour.  A sub-district is the Herderviertel in Mundenheim's North.

Oggersheim

Oggersheim (ca. 23,000 inhabitants) is one of the most important suburbs, being much like a town for itself (which it was in the Middle Ages). It is mentioned in the Wormser wall-building ordinance from around 900 as one of the places that shared responsibility for maintaining the city wall of Worms.

Helmut Kohl owned a bungalow in southern Oggersheim. The Wallfahrtskirche, a railway station, the important Unfallklinik (“accident hospital”), and several large residential blocks are to be found in Oggersheim. For the last few years, the northern subdistricts of Notwende and Melm have seen a large amount of building activities in their new housing estates.

Rheingönheim

Rheingönheim (ca 7,000 inhabitants), as the southernmost suburb of Ludwigshafen, is known mainly for its industry (Woellner) and its game enclosure Wildpark.

Maudach

Maudach (ca. 7,000 inhabitants), in Ludwigshafen's South-West, is a popular residential area, closely associated with the Maudacher Bruch park.

Ruchheim

Ruchheim (ca. 6,000 inhabitants), as the westernmost suburb, has long been a small agricultural village, but now it is growing rapidly due to new housing estates.

Transport

Although Ludwigshafen has no airfield, it is well connected with several airports in the region. There are small airfields near Speyer, Bad Dürkheim and Worms, a medium-sized regional airport in Mannheim, and the Frankfurt International Airport in about an hour's driving distance.

Ludwigshafen is the most important German harbour west of the Rhine. The local industry depends on shipping their raw materials and products on the river. The harbour of Ludwigshafen consists of several basins in the South of the city near Mundenheim (Luitpoldhafen, Kaiserwörthhafen, Mundenheimer Altrheinhafen), the wharfs along the river parallel to the city centre and the BASF, and, finally, of the Landeshafen basin in the North that connects the BASF.

Ludwigshafen has excellent Autobahn (motorway/highway) connections to all directions. Most important are the A 650 in west–east direction, the A 61 in north–south direction. But there are also A 6, A 65 and B 9 to be mentioned. Bundesstraße 37  and 44 pass the city center on elevated expressways. Parts of them are closed because of structural deficiencies. They continue across the Rhine to Mannheim ond Konrad Adenauer Bridge and Kurt Schumacher Bridge.

Ludwigshafen Hauptbahnhof is a huge station, its impressive pylon bridge pier serving as the city's landmark. The extraordinary architecture of the station complex is caused by the need to connect three joining tracks (to Frankenthal/Worms/Mainz, to Neustadt/Speyer and to Mannheim) and to work in the underground Straßenbahn station and the massive road bridge above the concourse. Other railway stations are at Oggersheim, Mundenheim, Rheingönheim, and, the new more central Ludwigshafen (Rhein) Mitte, near Berliner Platz. Since 2003, the S-Bahn Rhein-Neckar suburban train system runs successfully in the region.

Ludwigshafen's public transport system is run by the VBL (Verkehrsbetriebe Ludwigshafen) and the holding companies Rhein-Neckar-Verkehr (RNV) and VRN. There is an integrated Mannheim/Ludwigshafen tramway network; four tram lines (4,6,7,8) cross the Rhine bridges between the two cities and one other line (10) runs through Ludwigshafen only. In late 2008 Line 4 was extended and replaced Line 14 (also known as "Rhein-Haardt-Bahn"). Line 4 now serves as a long-distance line, which runs from Bad Dürkheim to Ludwigshafen, Mannheim and Heddesheim. The bus network consists of about ten municipal lines and further regional lines.

A rather strange feature of Ludwigshafen's public transport system is the existence of four underground tram stations (Rathaus, Danziger Platz (closed since late 2008), Hauptbahnhof, Hemshofstraße). They go back to the 1970s, when a common underground network in Mannheim and Ludwigshafen was planned. The rash construction of these first stations in Ludwigshafen became superfluous when Mannheim cancelled the project due to its enormous costs.

Region and neighbours

The twin cities of Mannheim and Ludwigshafen closely cooperate in many areas; although they are separated by the Baden-Württemberg/Rhineland Palatinate boundary, this frontier is mainly an administrative one.  Many Ludwigshafeners shop and go out in Mannheim's inner city, as it is within easy reach. In the reverse case, some Mannheimers work in Ludwigshafen and many University of Mannheim students choose Ludwigshafen as residence because of its cheaper rents.

The surroundings of Ludwigshafen on the left bank of the Rhine are called Pfalz and are the easternmost part of the Palatinate region. The administrative district around Ludwigshafen is called Rhein-Pfalz-Kreis. North of Ludwigshafen, there is the industrial town of Frankenthal. In the western vicinity of Ludwigshafen, there are several villages producing enormous amounts of vegetables, thus securing the Rheinpfalz the title of “Germany's vegetable garden”. The district south of Ludwigshafen is dominated by the Rhine and the Altrhein arms (lakes marking the earlier course of the river) and the ancient town of Speyer with its magnificent imperial cathedral, a noteworthy and remarkable city.

Culture

The Pfalzbau is a theatre and concert hall with regional importance. The Staatsphilharmonie Rheinland-Pfalz keeps its own symphonic orchestra, and there is a production company that stages operas 25 nights per year. In the Hemshof district, there are smaller theatres playing regional dialect plays.

The Wilhelm-Hack-Museum is the municipal art museum, with collections spanning from ancient to contemporary art. It is known for the emblematic Miró mural covering an entire façade, called the "Miró Wall" (Miró-Wand in German). The mural is a work of art by the Spanish artist Joan Miró, with the collaboration of his long-time colleague, the ceramist, Joan Gardy Artigas, and is made of 7,200 ceramic tiles. It has been subject to degradation due to air pollution since it was installed in 1979.

Several small museums in Ludwigshafen focus on the city's history, first of all the Stadtmuseum in the Rathaus Center, but also the Schillerhaus Oggersheim, K.O. Braun-Museum in Oppau or the Frankenthaler Kanal Museum in the North.

The Fachhochschule Ludwigshafen (technical college) specialises in economics and has an affiliated Ostasieninstitut (East Asia Institute). There is also the Evangelische Fachhochschule Ludwigshafen, specialising in social sciences.

Economy
Although BASF is by far the most important industrial company in Ludwigshafen, there are many other firms. Trade and industry in Ludwigshafen have about 90,000 employees in total, with an annual total turnover of nearly 17 billion euros.

BASF is the world's leading chemical company, employing 110,000 people in total and about 35,000 (a few years ago, the employee total was about 55,000) of them in the Ludwigshafen plant, which is also the largest chemical plant in the world. The company's main products are fertilizers, dye, coolants and many other chemical substances.
Among the other chemical companies with plants in Ludwigshafen rank BK Giulini, Abbvie, Raschig and Benckiser.
Other important branches of industry are mechanical engineering, electrical engineering, IT and brewery (Mayerbräu Oggersheim).

Sports

Ludwigshafen is one of the German cities that has never had a professional football club. This is all the more surprising, because Ludwigshafen is a typical "workers' city" and has quite a large stadium, the Südweststadion, built from debris from World War II with a capacity of around 40,000. Several international matches and some Bundesliga matches when 1. FC Kaiserslautern or Waldhof Mannheim used it as alternative stadium during the past decades have been held there.

Huddersfield Town left-back Dominik Werling was born in Ludwigshafen.

Formerly the most successful Ludwigshafen football club was FSV Oggersheim, whose team experienced short-term success when gaining promotion to the Regionalliga (3rd Division) at the end of the 2006–07 season. However, the club found itself outclassed, and as the financial situation grew worse after two poor seasons, the club withdrew to 11th tier local level play in 2010–11.

, Arminia Ludwigshafen is the highest-classed football club from the city, competing in the Oberliga Rheinland-Pfalz/Saar (V).

An athletics hall has been constructed near the Stadium a few years ago.

The TSG Friesenheim plays in the German 1st handball division since summer 2010.

Nature

There are several municipal parks in Ludwigshafen: First of all the Ebertpark in the North quarter and Friesenheim. It was created for the South German Horticulture Exhibition in 1925 with the Friedrich-Ebert-Halle, a multi-purpose hall.

The official Stadtpark, or municipal park, is somewhat remote from the city centre (yet easy to reach by the #10 tram), because it is situated on the Parkinsel, or park island, on a bank of the Rhine.

The Friedenspark is closer to the city centre, being located just north of the main station and west of the city hall. It is the youngest of Ludwigshafen's parks, having been created on a former industrial area.

Further, there are numerous smaller parks that are just a bit larger than a towel in the suburbs, for example the Stadtpark Oggersheim, Riedsaumpark, Alwin-Mittasch-Platz and Friesenpark in Friesenheim, Stadtpark Oppau, Bürgerpark Pfingstweide or Zedtwitzpark Mundenheim.

The Maudacher Bruch in the West between Maudach, Gartenstadt and Oggersheim, is a very extensive, horse-shoe shaped area, including the Michaelsberg (126m), a mountain built of debris and wreckage after World War II. Due to excessive extraction of ground water from chemical companies the ground water level drops and the diversity of nature is no longer preserved.
The Kief´scher Weiher in the South is connected with the Rhine and serves as yacht harbour, being surrounded by weekend camping areas.

Notable people

19th century

Ernst Bloch (1885–1977), philosopher and writer
Ernst A. Lehmann (1886–1937), airship captain and Zeppelin builder
William Dieterle (1893–1972), Hollywood film director, actor and Oscar-winner
Edgar Julius Jung (1894–1934), lawyer, politician and journalist
Gustav Ehrhart (1894–1971), chemist

20th century

1901–1940
Georg Gehring (1903–1943), wrestler, Olympic bronze medalist
Ernst Gutting (1919–2013) auxiliary bishop of Speyer
Klaus Gamber (1919–1989), Catholic priest and liturgical historian
Max Clos (1925–2002), French journalist
Rudolf Kortokraks (1928–2014), painter
Waldemar Schreckenberger (1929–2017), lawyer, professor emeritus and secretary of state and head of the Bundeskanzleramt 1982–1984
Helmut Kohl (1930–2017), German chancellor (1982–1998)
Kurt Biedenkopf (1930–2021), politician (CDU), former Ministerpräsident of Saxony (1990–2002)
Robert Franz Schmidt (1932–2017), physiologist and professor emeritus
Fanny Morweiser (1940–2014), author
Lambert Hamel (born 1940), actor

1951–1990
Manfred Kaltz (born 1953), football player and manager
Norbert Bolz (born 1953), media scientist
Doris Barnett (born 1953), politician (SPD), Member of Bundestag since 1994
Wolfgang Güllich (1960–1992), rock climber
Barbara Eligmann (born 1963), television presenter
Claudio Passarelli (born 1965), wrestler and champion
Joachim Weickert (born 1965), mathematician
Mario Kordić (born 1972), politician (HDZ BiH), mayor of Mostar
Sanne Kurz (born 1974), camera woman
Richard Möller (born 1977), football player and manager
Jan-Peter Peckolt (born 1981), sailor (49er dinghy)
André Schürrle (born 1990), footballer
Christian Dissinger (born 1991), handball player
Paul Ehmann (born 1993), footballer
Nadiem Amiri (born 1996), footballer
Apache 207 (born 1997), rapper

Twin towns – sister cities

Ludwigshafen is twinned with:

 Pasadena, United States (1948)
 Lorient, France (1963)
 Havering (London), United Kingdom (1971)
 Sumqayit, Azerbaijan (1987)
 Dessau-Roßlau, Germany (1988)
 Antwerp, Belgium (1999)
 Gaziantep, Turkey (2012)

References

External links

 
 Official City Website 
 Wilhelm-Hack-Museum 

 
Cities in Rhineland-Palatinate
Palatinate (region)